İkram Dinçer (born April 10, 1959) is a Turkish politician. 

He is a member of the Justice and Development Party. He was elected to Parliament in the 2007 general election as a deputy for Van for the 23rd legislative term. He is married and has three children.

References

External links
Official website (Turkish)

1959 births
Justice and Development Party (Turkey) politicians
21st-century Turkish politicians
Living people
Place of birth missing (living people)